James Plaisted Wilde, 1st Baron Penzance,  (12 July 1816 – 9 December 1899) was a noted British judge and rose breeder who was also a proponent of the Baconian theory that the works usually attributed to William Shakespeare were in fact written by Francis Bacon.

Background and education
Born in London, he was the son of Edward Archer Wilde, a solicitor, and Marianne (née Norris). His younger brother Sir Alfred Thomas Wilde was a Lieutenant-General in the Madras Army, while Sir John Wylde (Chief Justice of the Cape Colony) and Thomas Wilde, 1st Baron Truro (Lord Chancellor) were his uncles.

He was educated at Winchester College and Trinity College, Cambridge (matriculated 1834, graduated B.A. 1838, M.A. 1842). He was admitted to the Inner Temple in 1836, and called to the Bar in 1839.

Legal career
He became a successful lawyer himself and was appointed a Queen's Counsel in 1855. He was knighted in 1860, shortly after his appointment as a Baron of the Exchequer. He presided over the Court of Probate and Divorce from 1863 until his retirement in 1872, being raised to the peerage as Baron Penzance, of Penzance in the County of Cornwall, in 1869. He was the judge in the sensational Mordaunt divorce case.

In 1875, he accepted the post as Dean of Arches and presided over a number of notorious trials; Bell Cox, Dale, Enraght, Green and Tooth, under the Public Worship Regulation Act 1874 arising out of the Ritualist controversy in the Church of England.

In 1866, he presided over Hyde v. Hyde, a polygamy case. 
In his ruling, Lord Penzance stated:
What, then, is the nature of this institution as understood in Christendom?...If it be of common acceptance and existence, it must have some pervading identity and universal basis. I conceive that marriage, as understood in Christendom, may for this purpose be defined as the voluntary union for life of one man and one woman, to the exclusion of all others.

This remained the common-law definition of marriage throughout the British Empire and successor states. 
In Canada, it was overruled by an explicit statutory definition in the Civil Marriage Act 2005, which allowed for same-sex marriage.

Shakespeare
Wilde argued, following Lord Campbell and others, that the works of Shakespeare are extremely accurate in matters of law. In The Bacon-Shakespeare Controversy (1890)
he wrote of "Shakespeare's perfect familiarity with... English law... so perfect and intimate that he was never incorrect and never at fault", arguing that this was evidence that the plays were the work of a legal expert such as Bacon. Several other authors followed Wilde's arguments about the legal expertise used in Shakespeare, including Sir George Greenwood. Opponents of Wilde's view argued that Shakespeare's knowledge of the law was not exceptional.

Family and gardening
He married Lady Mary, daughter of William Pleydell-Bouverie, 3rd Earl of Radnor, in 1860. There were no children from the marriage. The couple resided at Eashing Park, Godalming.

At his garden in Godalming, from Rosa eglanteria and Rosa foetida he produced two new roses named Lady and Lord Penzance. He went on to produce a further 14 roses named after characters in the novels of Sir Walter Scott, including the Jeanie Deans Hybrid Rose.

Bibliography
Dewar, Mary. (1964). Sir Thomas Smith: A Tudor Intellectual in Office. London: Athlone.
Strype, John. (1698). The Life of the Learned Sir Thomas Smith, T. D.C.L. New York: Burt Franklin, 1974. .
Wilde, J.P. (1902) Lord Penzance on the Bacon-Shakespeare Controversy - A Judicial Summing-Up
Wilde, J.P. (ed.) M.H. Kinnear (1992) Lord Penzance's Trial of Shakespeare: Verdict for Bacon

Arms

References

Attribution

External links

 Rose fancier's page
 Description of Lord Penzance's home, Eashing Park, from Country Life 1889

1816 births
1899 deaths
19th-century English judges
English gardeners
English rose horticulturists
Rose breeders
English literary critics
English Anglo-Catholics
Barons in the Peerage of the United Kingdom
Baconian theory of Shakespeare authorship
British King's Counsel
Shakespeare authorship theorists
Alumni of Trinity College, Cambridge
Barons of the Exchequer
19th-century British journalists
British male journalists
Members of the Inner Temple
Members of the Privy Council of the United Kingdom
Members of the Judicial Committee of the Privy Council
Peers of the United Kingdom created by Queen Victoria